Can-Am ATVs and side-by-side vehicles are manufactured by BRP / Bombardier Recreational Products a Canadian company, once part of Bombardier Inc. Founded in 1942 as L'Auto-Neige Bombardier Limitée (Bombardier Snow Car Limited) by Joseph-Armand Bombardier in Valcourt, Quebec, Canada.

BRP owns manufacturing facilities in Canada, the United States, Mexico, Finland, and Austria BRP products including Can-Am all-terrain vehicles (ATV) and Side-by-Side (SxS, UTV, SSV) vehicles are distributed in over 100 countries by more than 4,200 dealers and distributors. BRP also employs more than 7,100 people around the globe.

Can-Am Off-Road offers a full line of ATV and Side-by-Side vehicles that are designed for riders of all skill levels and age groups. The 2015 Can-Am ATV and Side-by-Side vehicle lineup includes:

History

Can-Am was brought to life in 1972 when BRP created Can-Am as a motorcycle brand. Can-Am first manufactured high-performance motocross dirtbikes.

In February 1998, BRP entered yet another market which was all-terrain vehicles (ATVs) by introducing a prototype of the Traxter - a utility based ATV.

Just one year later, the BRP Traxter all-terrain vehicle was named "ATV of the Year" by ATV Magazine. Later that year, BRP also began working on their second ATV which would be a pure sport ATV called the DS650 that was designed for experienced sports enthusiasts.

BRP added an additional variation of the Traxter all-terrain vehicle in 2000 which was called the Traxter XL. The BRP Traxter XL was the first 4x4 all-terrain vehicle to feature a dumping box-bed.

In 2002, BRP introduced another Traxter all-terrain vehicle called the Traxter MAX which featured two seats. The BRP Traxter MAX was the first manufacturer-approved ATV for two people.

2005 was a successful racing season for BRP. In January, Antoine Morel of France successfully completed and won what is arguably the hardest off-road race in the world, the Dakar Rally, racing on a BRP DS 650X. In late October, BRP wins its first GNCC Racing Series Championship in the Utility Modified ATV Class on an Outlander 800 ATV. BRP would earn a total of 12 GNCC Racing Championships in the following four seasons of GNCC Racing.

In September 2005, BRP introduced the APACHE track kit - which was the first and only OEM ATV Track kit to fit most major all-terrain vehicles.

May 2006 was a big year for Can-Am. It was announced that Bombardier ATV would become Can-Am ATV. Starting in 2007, BRP launched and re-branded its ATV segment to Can-Am.

Just one year after announcing the re-branding, BRP inaugurates its new plant in Juarez, Mexico. The new plant would oversee manufacturing and assembly of the Can-Am Outlander and Renegade ATV model lineup including the Rotax engines that power these two all-terrain vehicles.

In January 2006, the newly branded Can-Am ATV earns yet another Dakar Rally win along with taking rest of the three positions on the podium in the ATV category. Juan Manuel Gonzales, Antoine Morel and Alain Morel, spent 16 challenging days and traversed more than 9,000 kilometers from Lisbon, Portugal, to Dakar, Senegal to earn a spot on the podium in the 2006 Dakar Rally aboard Can-Am all-terrain vehicles (ATVs).

2010 was another milestone for Can-Am when they first introduced the Can-Am Commander - their first side-by-side vehicle. The 2011 Can-Am Commander model line up featured a total of six models with two different engine sizes to choose from. The Can-Am Commander 1000 features an 85-hp Rotax 1000 V-Twin engine, an industry exclusive dual-level cargo box.

Shortly after its introduction, the Can-Am Commander 1000 receives the "Best of the Best" Award in the Side-by-Side vehicle category by Field & Stream magazine in 2011.

Two years later, Can-Am announced another side-by-side vehicle the 2013 Can-Am Maverick. The Can-Am Maverick 1000R was designed to be a pure sport side-by-side and would compete against the Polaris RZR XP 1000 and the Arctic Cat Wildcat 1000 H.O. The Can-Am Maverick featured the highest horsepower from a manufacturer at the time of 101 horsepower with its 976cc Rotax V-Twin engine.

In September 2014, Can-Am introduced the industry's first side-by-side vehicle to come with a turbo straight from the manufacturer. The Can-Am Maverick X ds Turbo features a 121-hp Rotax 1000R turbocharged option - which is currently the highest horsepower side-by-side vehicle on the market. Along with the introduction of the 2015 Can-Am Maverick X ds, Can-Am also expanded their line of recreational side-by-side vehicles by adding the Can-Am Commander MAX Limited Model.

Notes

Bombardier Recreational Products